Desio is a town and  in the Province of Monza and Brianza, Italy.

History
In 1277 it was the location of the battle between the Visconti and della Torre families for the rule of Milan. On 24 February 1924, Desio received the honorary title of city with a royal decree.

In 1944 the opera singer Giuseppina Finzi-Magrini was killed in an American air raid on Desio.

The town is known for being Pius XI’s birthplace, information which the road sign on Desio’s border recalls. In the centre, more precisely in Via Pio XI 4, tourists and citizens can visit the Pope’s house every Sunday. On November 20, 1998, it was instituted the International Studies and Documentation Center Pius XI, at the presence of Mgr. Maurizio Galli. On 28 May 2022, Desio’s hospital was named after Pius XI to celebrate the 100th anniversary of the Pope’s election.

Marco Sportiello, Atalanta B.C. goalkeeper, was also born in Desio.

Gabriele Oriali, former Inter‘s icon and 1982 FIFA World Cup winner with Italy, lives in Desio.

Main sights
Villa Tittoni Traversi (18th century)
Torre dei Palagi (19th century)
Polo di Eccellenza

Transport
Desio is served by Desio railway station.

Sports
Gruppo Sportivo Santi Pietro e Paolo, also referred to as S. Pietro e Paolo Desio, is one of the most famous football teams in Desio. Founded in October 
2003, the Group started its activities in March 2004 becoming affiliated with the Centro Sportivo Italiano (CSI), the Entity for Sport Promotion acknowledged by the Italian National Olympic Committee and the Episcopal Conference of Italy.

References